This is a list of symbols of the District of Columbia.

Insignia

Species

Geology

Culture

See also
 Outline of the District of Columbia

References 

Symbols

District of Columbia